Nildottie is a locality in the Australian state of South Australia located on the east side of the Murray River about  east of the state capital of Adelaide and about  north-east of the municipal seat in Mannum.

Nildottie's boundaries were created on 27 March 2003 for the "long established name" and include the sites of the Kroehns Landing Shack Site and Scrubby Flat Shack Site. On 22 December 2011, Nildottie was enlarged by the addition of land on its northern side after the locality of Greenways Landing was abolished following a request from residents and local government.

The name is derived from the Aboriginal word 'ngurltartang', which means 'smoke signal hill'.

The 2016 Australian census which was conducted in August 2016 reports that Nildottie had 189 people living within its boundaries.

Nildottie is located within the federal division of Barker, the state electoral district of Chaffey and the local government area of the Mid Murray Council.

See also
Ngaut Ngaut Conservation Park

Notes and references

Towns in South Australia
Populated places on the Murray River